Aldina Matilde Barros da Lomba is an Angolan politician for MPLA and a member of the National Assembly of Angola.

References

Living people
Members of the National Assembly (Angola)
MPLA politicians
21st-century Angolan women politicians
21st-century Angolan politicians
Governors of Cabinda
1964 births